Ralph Hayes is an American author of action-adventure, espionage, crime-fiction and western paperbacks. The magazines his work has appeared in include Alfred Hitchcock Mystery Magazine. The Michigan native has had nearly 100 books published over the course of five decades. Most of his literary work features exotic locations based on his international traveling. In a 2019 interview Hayes explained that his wife (now deceased) was a successful artist and her work was in exhibits throughout the U.S. and Europe. Following her artistic career, Hayes was able to visit South Africa, Morocco, Peru, Hong Kong and Egypt and used those experiences in his storytelling.

Biography

1960s 

After departing from a law practice, Ralph Hayes began authoring stories and full-length novels in 1969. His earliest published work was a short story titled "The Gumdrop Affair", which was featured in a 1967 issue of Alfred Hitchcock Mystery Magazine.

1970s 

Beginning in 1970, Ralph Hayes released the first of many western novels featuring protagonist O'Brien. Known as the "Buffalo Hunter" series, Hayes authored six installments in the 1970s. These were published by a combination of Belmont Tower, Lenox Hill and Manor. Hayes contributed installments in the "Nick Carter: Killmaster" series from 1972 to 1974. These books were authored under the house name Nick Carter. From 1974 to 1975, Hayes wrote the six-volume spy-fiction series titled "Agent of Cominsec" published by Belmont Tower. During the period of 1975–1976, Hayes authored the six-book team-combat series entitled "Check Force" for the Manor publishing house. Hayes wrote "The Hunter" vigilante series, often referred to as the name "John Yard", for Belmont Tower in 1975. Later, from 1976 to 1978, Hayes wrote the four-volume adventure series called "Stoner" for Manor. During the two-year period of 1977–1978, Hayes authored six novels in the military fiction series "Soldier of Fortune" for publisher Belmont Tower. These were written under the name Peter McCurtin, a prolific author of men's action-adventure novels, westerns and mystery-thrillers. In addition to the many series' he contributed to, Hayes also authored 15 stand-alone novels of crime-fiction and action-adventure for publishers such as Zebra, Jove and Leisure.

1980s 

Citing a publishing decline, Hayes reduced his literary output in the 1980s. Before returning full-time to his law practice, Hayes wrote 11 stand-alone novels for publishers like Leisure and Zebra between 1980 and 1984. He also authored one installment of the "Buffalo Hunter" series in 1984 as well as one volume of "Soldier of Fortune" in 1985.

1990s 

Returning to his writing career in the 1990s, Hayes focused solely on the western-fiction genre. He authored two stand-alone westerns between 1992 and 1993 for the publisher Pinnacle. He also contributed to the "Buffalo Hunter" series with one installment authored in 1992 for Pinnacle. As house name Dodge Tyler, Hayes wrote the first six volumes of the 12-book series "Daniel Boone: Lost Wilderness Tales" released by Leisure.

2000s 

Again, centralizing his writing within the western-fiction genre, Hayes authored three more installments of the "Buffalo Hunter" series from 2013 to 2015. He wrote six stand-alone western books between 2016 and 2019. All of Hayes' 2000s literary work has been solely published by the imprint Black Horse Westerns, owned by The Crowood Press.

Influences 

In a 2019 Paperback Warrior interview, Hayes says lists his favorite writers as Ernest Hemingway, Jane Austen, John Le Carre and B. Traven.

Bibliography

Agent of Cominsec 

 The Bloody Monday Conspiracy - 1974 Belmont Tower
 The Doomsday Conspiracy - 1974 Belmont Tower
 The Turkish Mafia Conspiracy - 1974 Belmont Tower
 The Hellfire Conspiracy - 1974 Belmont Tower
 The Nightmare Conspiracy - 1974 Belmont Tower
 The Deathmakers Conspiracy - 1975 Belmont Tower

The Buffalo Hunter 

 Gunslammer (aka Secret of Sulpher Creek) - 1970 Belmont Tower
 Four Ugly Guns - 1970 Belmont Tower
 The Name is O'Brien - 1972 Lenox Hill
 Hellohole - 1973 Leisure/Belmont Tower
 Treasure of Rio Verde - 1974 Remploy
 Vengeance is Mine - 1978 Manor
 Five Deadly Guns - 1984 Ulverscroft
 Revenge of the Buffalo Hunter - 1992 Pinnacle
 The Last Buffalo - 2013 Black Horse
 Fort Revenge - 2013 Black Horse
 Coyote Moon - 2015 Black Horse

Check Force 

 100 Megaton Kill - 1975 Manor
 Clouds of War - 1975 Manor
 Judgment Day - 1975 Manor
 The Peking Plot - 1975 Manor
 Seeds of Doom - 1976 Manor
 Fires of Hell - 1976 Manor

Daniel Boone: Lost Wilderness Tales 

 River Run Red (as Dodge Tyler) - 1996 Leisure
 Algonquin Massacre (as Dodge Tyler) - 1996 Leisure
 Death at Spanish Wells (as Dodge Tyler) - 1996 Leisure
 Winter Kill (as Dodge Tyler) - 1996 Leisure
 Apache Revenge (as Dodge Tyler) - 1997 Leisure
 Death Trail (as Dodge Tyler) - 1997 Leisure

The Hunter 

 Scavenger Kill - 1975 Leisure/Belmont Tower
 Night of the Jackals - 1975 Leisure/Belmont
 A Taste for Blood - 1975 Leisure/Belmont Tower
 The Track of the Beast - 1975 Leisure/Belmont Tower
 The Deadly Prey - 1975 Leisure/Belmont Tower

Nick Carter: Killmaster 

 The Cairo Mafia - 1972 Award
 Assault on England - 1972 Award
 The Omega Terror - 1972 Award
 Strike Force Terror - 1972 Award
 Butcher of Belgrade - 1973 Award
 Agent Counter-Agents - 1973 Award
 Assassin: Code Name Vulture - 1974 Award
 Vatican Vendetta (with George Snyder) - 1974 Award

Soldier of Fortune (as Peter McCurtin) 

 The Guns of Palembang - 1977 Belmont Tower
 First Blood - 1977 Belmont Tower
 Ambush at Derati Wells - 1977 Belmont Tower
 Operation Hong Kong - 1977 Belmont Tower
 Body Count - 1977 Belmont Tower
 Battle Pay - 1978 Belmont Tower
 Blood Island - 1985 Leisure

Stoner 

 The Golden God - 1976 Manor
 Satan Stone - 1976 Manor
 All That Glitters - 1977 Manor
 King's Ransom - 1978 Manor

Stand Alone Works 

 The Wayward August of Virgie Tats 
 Black Day at Diablo 
 The Visiting Moon - 1971 Lenox Hill
 Treasure of Rio Verde - 1974 Remploy
 Love's Dark Conquest - 1978 Leisure
 Forbidden Splendor - 1978 Leisure
 Dark Water - 1978 Leisure
 By Passion Possessed - 1978 Leisure
 The Killing Ground - 1978 Leisure
 Savage Dawn - 1979 Jove
 The Big Fall - 1979 Zebra
 Hostages of Hell - 1979
 Adventuring - 1979 Jove
 Golden Passion - 1979 Leisure
 Dragon's Fire - 1979 Leisure
 The Promised Land - 1980 Leisure
 The Sea Runners - 1981 Leisure
 A Sudden Madness - 1981 Leisure
 Last View of Eden - 1981 Leisure
 Charleston - 1982 Zebra
 Drought! - 1982 Zebra
 The God Game - 1983 Leisure
 The Scorpio Cipher - 1983 Leisure
 Sheryl - 1984 Leisure
 Deadly Reunion - 1984 Leisure
 Illegal Entry - 1984 Leisure
 Mountain Man's Fury - 1992 Pinnacle
 Mountain Man's Gold - 1993 Pinnacle
 Tombstone Vendetta - 2010 Black Horse
 Texas Vengeance - 2016 Black Horse
 Rawhide Justice - 2016 Black Horse
 Lawless Breed - 2017 Black Horse
 The Way of the Gun - 2018 Black Horse
 Wanted: Dead or Alive - 2019 Black Horse

References 

Living people
Year of birth missing (living people)
American crime fiction writers
Writers from Michigan